The Society of Pharmacovigilance, India (SoPI), is an Indian national non-profit scientific organisation, which aims at organizing training programmes and providing expertise in pharmacovigilance and enhance all aspects of the safe and proper use of medicines

The International Society of Pharmacovigilance (ISoP) granted status of 'associated society' to Society of Pharmacovigilance India (SoPI). It is the second professional society in the world after ISoP.

The founder of SoPI is KC Singhal.

Annual Events
 14th Annual Conference of SoPI (SoPICON 2014), Aligarh, India 
 19th Annual Conference of SoPI (SoPICON 2022), Online/Hybrid

Official Publication
 Journal of Pharmacovigilance and Drug Safety (ISSN: 0972-8899)

Office Bearers

 Prof. KC Singhal (Patron)
 Dr. Sandeep Agarwal (President)
 Prof. Syed Ziaur Rahman (General Secretary)

See also
Uppsala Monitoring Centre (WHO)
Council for International Organizations of Medical Sciences
EudraVigilance
Virtue Insight

References

Further reading

External links
Official Website of SoPI Society of Pharmacovigilance, India
Official Journal of SoPI Journal of Pharmacovigilance and Drug Safety

Pharmaceuticals policy
Drug safety
Pharmacological societies
Pharmacology journals
Clinical research
Clinical trials
Pharmacological classification systems